The 1996–97 NBA season was the Nuggets' 21st season in the National Basketball Association, and 30th season as a franchise. In the off-season, the Nuggets acquired Mark Jackson and Ricky Pierce from the Indiana Pacers, acquired Šarūnas Marčiulionis from the Sacramento Kings, and signed free agents Ervin Johnson and Eric Murdock, although Murdock was released to free agency in November after just 12 games. However, after a 4–9 start to the season, Bernie Bickerstaff resigned as head coach and was replaced with Dick Motta, where the Nuggets then lost ten straight games, and held a 16–32 record at the All-Star break.

At midseason, Jackson was traded back to his former team, the Indiana Pacers, while Pierce was dealt to the Charlotte Hornets in exchange for second-year guard Anthony Goldwire. The team also signed free agent and three-point specialist Kenny Smith, who won two championships with the Houston Rockets. As the season drew, the Nuggets still struggled losing 26 of their final 30 games, finishing fifth in the Midwest Division with a 21–61 record.

LaPhonso Ellis had a stellar season, averaging 21.9 points and 7.0 rebounds per game, but only played 55 games due to knee injuries and a ruptured Achilles tendon, while second-year star Antonio McDyess averaged 18.3 points, 7.3 rebounds and 1.7 blocks per game, and Dale Ellis provided the team with 16.6 points per game. In addition, Bryant Stith contributed 14.9 points per game, but only played 52 games due to a foot injury, while Johnson provided with 7.1 points, 11.1 rebounds and 2.8 blocks per game, and Tom Hammonds averaged 6.2 points and 5.0 rebounds per game off the bench.

Following the season, McDyess was traded to the Phoenix Suns, while Dale Ellis was traded back to his former team, the Seattle SuperSonics, Johnson was dealt to the Milwaukee Bucks, Hammonds signed as a free agent with the Minnesota Timberwolves during the next season, Smith and Marčiulionis both retired, and Motta was fired as head coach.

Draft picks

Roster

Roster Notes
 Point guard Eric Murdock was waived on November 26.

Regular season

Season standings

z - clinched division title
y - clinched division title
x - clinched playoff spot

Record vs. opponents

Game log

Player statistics

Regular season

Player Statistics Citation:

Awards and records

Transactions

References

See also
 1996-97 NBA season

Denver Nuggets seasons
1996 in sports in Colorado
1997 in sports in Colorado
Denver Nug